Henry IV (11 November 1050 – 7 August 1106) was Holy Roman Emperor from 1084 to 1105, King of Germany from 1054 to 1105, King of Italy and Burgundy from 1056 to 1105, and Duke of Bavaria from 1052 to 1054. He was the son of Henry III, Holy Roman Emperor—the second monarch of the Salian dynasty—and Agnes of Poitou. After his father's death on 5 October 1056, Henry was placed under his mother's guardianship. She made grants to German aristocrats to secure their support. Unlike her late husband, she could not control the election of the popes, thus the idea of the "liberty of the Church" strengthened during her rule. Taking advantage of her weakness, Archbishop Anno II of Cologne kidnapped Henry in April 1062. He administered Germany until Henry came of age in 1065.

Henry endeavoured to recover the royal estates that had been lost during his minority. He employed low-ranking officials to carry out his new policies, causing discontent in Saxony and Thuringia. Henry crushed a riot in Saxony in 1069 and overcame the rebellion of the Saxon aristocrat Otto of Nordheim in 1071. The appointment of commoners to high office offended German aristocrats, and many of them withdrew from Henry's court. He insisted on his royal prerogative to appoint bishops and abbots, although the reformist clerics condemned this practice as simony (a forbidden sale of church offices). Pope Alexander II blamed Henry's advisors for his acts and excommunicated them in early 1073. Henry's conflicts with the Holy See and the German dukes weakened his position and the Saxons rose up in open rebellion in the summer of 1074. Taking advantage of a quarrel between the Saxon aristocrats and peasantry, he forced the rebels into submission in October 1075.

Henry adopted an active policy in Italy, alarming Pope Alexander II's successor, Gregory VII, who threatened him with excommunication for simony. Henry persuaded most of the German bishops to declare the Pope's election invalid on 24 January 1076. In response, the Pope excommunicated Henry and released his subjects from their allegiance. German aristocrats who were hostile to Henry called for the Pope to hold an assembly in Germany to hear Henry's case. To prevent the Pope from sitting in judgement on him, Henry went to Italy as far as Canossa to meet with the Pope. His penitential "Walk to Canossa" was a success and Gregory VII had no choice but to absolve him in January 1077. Henry's German opponents ignored his absolution and elected an antiking, Rudolf of Rheinfelden, on 14 March 1077. The Pope was initially neutral in the two kings' conflict, enabling Henry to consolidate his position. Henry continued to appoint high-ranking clerics, for which the Pope again excommunicated him on 7 March 1080. Most German and northern Italian bishops remained loyal to Henry and they elected the antipope Clement III. Rudolf of Rheinfelden was killed in battle and his successor, Hermann of Salm, could only exert royal authority in Saxony. From 1081, Henry launched a series of military campaigns to Italy, and Clement III crowned him emperor in Rome on 1 April 1084.

Hermann of Salm died and Henry pacified Saxony with the local aristocrats' assistance in 1088. He launched an invasion against the pope's principal Italian ally, Matilda of Tuscany, in 1089. She convinced Henry's elder son, Conrad II, to take up arms against his father in 1093. Her alliance with Welf I, Duke of Bavaria, prevented Henry's return to Germany until 1096 when he was reconciled with Welf. After Clement III's death, Henry did not support new antipopes, but did not make peace with Pope Paschal II. Henry proclaimed the first  (imperial peace) which covered the whole territory of Germany in 1103. His younger son, Henry V, forced him to abdicate on 31 December 1105. He tried to regain his throne with the assistance of Lotharingian aristocrats, but became ill and died without receiving absolution from his excommunication. Henry's preeminent role in the Investiture Controversy, his "Walk to Canossa" and his conflicts with his sons and wives established his controversial reputation, with some regarding him as the stereotype of a tyrant, and others describing him as an exemplary monarch who protected the poor.

Background

Henry was the third monarch of the Salian dynasty—the royal house ruling Germany from 1024 to 1125. The 11th-century kings of Germany also ruled Italy and Burgundy and had a strong claim to the title of Holy Roman Emperor. They were convinced that their claim to the emperorship entitled them each to act as the head of all Christians and to control papal elections in Rome. Rome was actually dominated by local aristocrats, the Tusculani and the Crescentii, who raised their own candidates to the papal throne. Their rivalries caused scandals, culminating in three rival popes—Benedict IX, Sylvester III and Gregory VI—in 1045. To put an end to the schism, Henry's father, Henry III, crossed the Alps to Italy and held a church synod at Sutri on 20 December 1046. The synod deposed the three popes and replaced them with a German prelate, Bishop Suidger of Bamberg, who assumed the name Clement II.

Henry III emphasized the priestly nature of kingship, attributing it to the kings' anointment by holy oil. A man of great personal piety, he regarded himself as "Vicar of Christ", authorized to administer state and church alike. The Romans awarded him the hereditary title of patrician, acknowledging his and his successors' right to cast the first vote at papal elections. His new title enabled him to secure the appointment of German clerics to the papal throne. The third German pope, Leo IX, came from Lotharingia—a province that had been an important centre of reformist clerics. They wanted to purify the Church through the re-implementation of ancient (or supposedly ancient) collections of canon law and Leo IX enthusiastically introduced their ideas to Rome. He prohibited simony—the sale of church offices—and promoted clerical celibacy. Imperial control of church affairs was in the long run incompatible with the reformist idea of "liberty of the Church" which claimed that ecclesiastic institutions could only be subject to the authority of the Holy See. The conflict between the two ideas reached its pinnacle during Henry IV's reign, developing into the confrontation known as the Investiture Controversy.

Germany, Italy and Burgundy were composed of semi-independent provinces, each administered by a prelate or a lay aristocrat. The prelates—the bishops and abbots—were not only wealthy landowners, they also played an important role in state administration. They were required to make annual gifts to the kings and also to provide the monarchs with well-defined regular services, including the collection of taxes and hospitality. The dukes were the most powerful lay aristocrats in Germany. They were primarily military commanders, but they were also responsible for the administration of justice. The monarchs occasionally kept the office of duke for themselves or for their closest relatives, but sooner or later they had no choice but to fill vacant duchies, because they depended on the most powerful aristocrats' support.

Henry III came into conflict with influential dukes towards the end of his life. Godfrey the Bearded, Duke of Upper Lotharingia, married a wealthy widow, Margravine Beatrice of Tuscany, without the Emperor's consent. Henry III also outraged the Saxon duke, Bernard II, because he supported the duke's main rival, Archbishop Adalbert of Hamburg, in the seizure of some Saxon counties. The Salian kings who inherited their Ottonian predecessors' domains in Saxony visited the province frequently. Their lengthy visits irritated the Saxon aristocrats who were exposed to direct royal control for more time than their peers in other parts of the empire. The Saxons' grievances against the Salian monarchs broke out in a series of revolts during Henry IV's reign.

The empire's neighbours caused no less concern. Henry III launched punitive expeditions against Bohemia to extort an oath of fealty from the rebellious Duke Bretislav I. King Peter of Hungary, who owed his throne to Henry, also swore fealty to him, but was dethroned in 1046. Henry invaded Hungary, but could not force Peter's successor, King Andrew I, into submission. Andrew designated his brother, Béla, as his heir. Conflicts between Andrew and Béla, and later between their sons, culminated during the first decades of Henry IV's reign, provoking German military campaigns against Hungary. Henry III asserted his authority over the southern Italian princes, including the Norman counts of Aversa and Apulia in 1047. The absent emperor, however, could not control the Norman adventurers and he chose to charge the popes with the representation of his interests in southern Italy.

Early life

Born on 11 November 1050, Henry was the son of the Holy Roman Emperor, Henry III, by his second wife, Agnes of Poitou. Henry was most likely born in his father's palace at Goslar. His birth had been long-awaited; Henry III had fathered four daughters, but his subjects were convinced only a male heir could secure the "peace of kingdom" (as Hermann II, Archbishop of Cologne, called it in a sermon). Henry was first named for his grandfather, Conrad II, Holy Roman Emperor, but Abbot Hugh of Cluny, whom Henry III had appointed as his son's godfather, convinced the Emperor to give his name to his heir. While celebrating Christmas 1050 at Pöhlde in Saxony, the ailing Henry III designated his infant son as his successor.

Archbishop Hermann baptised Henry in Cologne on Easter Sunday 1051. In November, the Emperor held an assembly at Tribur to secure his son's succession. The German princes who attended the meeting elected the one-year-old king. They stipulated they would acknowledge him as his father's successor only if he acted as a "just ruler" during his father's lifetime. Historian Ian S. Robinson supposes the princes actually wanted to persuade Henry III to change his methods of government since the child king had no role in state administration. At Christmas 1052, the Emperor made Henry the duke of Bavaria.

Archbishop Hermann crowned Henry King of Germany in Aachen on 17 July 1054. On this occasion, Henry's two-year-old younger brother, Conrad, most likely received Bavaria from their father. When Conrad died in 1055, the Emperor gave Bavaria to Empress Agnes. The Emperor betrothed Henry to Bertha of Savoy in late 1055. Her parents, Adelaide, Margravine of Turin, and Otto, Count of Savoy, controlled north-western Italy. The Emperor wanted to secure their alliance against the rebellious Godfrey the Bearded.

Henry III fell seriously ill after eating a stag's liver in late September 1056. Historian Herbert Schutz attributes his sudden illness to his exhaustion. Already dying, the Emperor commended his son to the protection of Pope Victor II who had come from Italy to Germany to seek the Emperor's protection against the Norman rulers of southern Italy. Henry III died on 5 October 1056.

Reign as king

Under guardianship

At the age of six, Henry became sole monarch of the empire. Pope Victor II convinced the German aristocrats to swear fealty to their young king and enthroned him in Aachen. Although Empress Agnes had been planning to enter a nunnery, she was appointed her son's guardian. She was responsible for her son's education along with a royal  (unfree liegeman), Cuno. She secured the most powerful aristocrats' support through lavish grants. Agnes was reconciled with Godfrey the Bearded and made her late husband's other opponent, Conrad of the Ezzonid family, duke of Carinthia.

Agnes took full control of state administration as regent after Pope Victor II left Germany early in 1057, but she paid little attention to Burgundy and Italy. Henry had inherited his father's Roman title of patrician, but the concept of "liberty of the Church" became dominant in Rome during his minority. Pope Victor's successor, Stephen IX—Godfrey the Bearded's brother—was elected without royal intervention early in August.

A group of Saxon aristocrats plotted against Henry, fearing he would continue his father's oppressive policies after reaching the age of majority. They convinced Otto of Nordmark, who had recently returned from exile, to mount a coup. Henry's two relatives, Bruno II and Egbert I of Brunswick, attacked the conspirators. Bruno killed Otto but was mortally wounded in the skirmish.

In 1057, Agnes appointed a wealthy aristocrat, Rudolf of Rheinfelden, to be Duke of Swabia and also charged him with the administration of Burgundy. Godfrey the Bearded took possession of Spoleto and Fermo, probably through a royal grant. Rumours of Godfrey's determination to seize the imperial crown with Pope Stephen's help spread in Italy, but the Pope died unexpectedly on 29 March 1058.

The Roman aristocrats placed one of their number, Giovanni, Cardinal Bishop of Velletri, on the papal throne without consulting with Henry's representatives. Giovanni took the name Benedict X, but Peter Damian, the Cardinal-Bishop of Ostia, refused to consecrate him, although the consecration of a new pope had been the Ostian bishops' traditional privilege. The cardinals assembled at Florence where Pope Stephen had died to discuss Pope Stephen's succession. They wanted to elect the local bishop Gerard pope and sent an envoy to Germany to inform Henry about their plan. Henry, "having deliberated with the princes", designated Gerard as the Pope in Augsburg on 7 June. King Andrew I of Hungary also sent delegates to Germany in September 1058. Andrew wanted to secure his five-year-old son Solomon's succession, ignoring his brother's claim to succeed him. The Hungarian envoys and Henry's representatives concluded a treaty, and Henry's sister, Judith, was engaged to Solomon.

The reformist clerics elected Bishop Gerard pope in Florence in December 1058. He took the name Nicholas II. Godfrey the Bearded accompanied him to Rome and forced Antipope Benedict to leave the city. His advisor, the monk Hildebrand, was determined to strengthen the autonomy of the papacy. The Pope held a synod which issued a decree, establishing the cardinals' right to elect the popes as against election by people and clergy, which had been manipulated by Henry III. Referring to Henry IV as "presently king and with the help of God emperor-to-be", the decree also confirmed the emperors' existing prerogatives over papal elections, but without specifying them. As early as 1057–1058, however, Cardinal Humbert of Silva Candida questioned the monarchs' right to invest clerics with bishoprics and abbeys in his treatises against simony.

Pope Nicholas invested two Norman rulers, Robert Guiscard and Richard I of Capua, with southern Italian duchies in 1059. In return, the Normans swore fealty to the Pope and promised to support him against his enemies, probably the Roman aristocrats. Although the duchies were imperial fiefs, Nicholas's action did not necessarily trespass on imperial rights, because the popes had acted as the emperors' representatives in southern Italy for a decade. However, the Pope's treaty with the Normans forged their lasting alliance.

Andrew I of Hungary faced a rebellion from his brother, Duke Béla, in 1060. Agnes dispatched Bavarian, Saxon and Bohemian troops to Hungary to fight Béla and his Polish allies, but the three armies did not coordinate their movements. Béla defeated his brother who died of his wounds. Andrew's family fled to Germany, and Béla was crowned king on 6 December. After Béla's victory, the command of the German duchies along the Hungarian frontier had to be strengthened. Agnes ceded Bavaria to a wealthy Saxon lord, Otto of Nordheim, and replaced Duke Conrad of Carinthia with Berthold of Zähringen in early 1061.

Relations between Pope Nicholas and the German prelates became tense for unknown reasons in 1061. When Nicholas died on 20 July 1061, the Roman aristocrats dispatched an embassy to Henry asking him to nominate a new pope. Hildebrand and other reformist clerics elected Anselm of Baggio, Bishop of Lucca, pope on 30 September without Henry's confirmation. Anselm took the name Pope Alexander II. Henry summoned the Italian bishops to a synod in Basel to discuss the situation. He attended the synod, wearing the insignia of his office of patrician of the Romans. The synod elected Cadalus, Bishop of Parma, antipope on 28 October.

The election of two popes divided the German clergy. Some bishops supported Cadalus (now known as Honorius II) and others accepted Alexander II. Archbishop Adalbert of Hamburg was Honorius's most prominent supporter, while Archbishop Anno II of Cologne acknowledged Alexander as the lawful pope. Empress Agnes supported Honorius, for which her advisors were excommunicated by Alexander. Her blatant favouritism for Bishop Henry II of Augsburg and the complete failure of the Hungarian campaign had compromised her prestige; the schism raised more indignation. Archbishop Anno, Egbert of Brunswick, Otto of Nordheim and other discontented aristocrats decided to deprive her of the regency. Archbishop Anno equipped a ship "with admirable workmanship" and sailed down the Rhine to an island near the royal palace at Kaiserswerth in April 1062. The ship fascinated Henry, so Anno could easily talk him into a visit on it. As soon as Henry stepped on board, the ship was cast off. Fearing his captors wanted to murder him, Henry jumped into the river. He almost drowned, but Egbert of Brunswick rescued him.

The "Coup of Kaiserswerth" destroyed the Empress's self-confidence, and she retired to her estates. Anno replaced her as the head of the government. His new title of magister (master) shows that he also took charge of Henry's education. Anno was determined to put an end to the schism. In October 1062, the synod of the German bishops appointed his nephew, Burchard II, Bishop of Halberstadt, to begin negotiations with Pope Alexander II. That same month, the theologian Peter Damian completed a treatise defending the legality of Alexander II's election. He emphasised that Henry's "right to participate in the papal elections ... is subject each time to reconfirmation by the pope". Damian's argument implied that Henry only inherited a claim to the imperial prerogatives relating to papal elections, but he could forfeit it. Respect for the monarch also declined in Germany. For example, the retainers of Abbot Widerad of Fulda and Bishop Hezilo of Hildesheim ignored Henry's commands when an armed conflict broke out between them in his presence at a church in Goslar in June 1063.

Béla I of Hungary wanted to make peace with Henry to secure his throne against his nephew, Solomon, who had taken refuge in Germany. Henry and his advisors, however, insisted on Solomon's restoration to the Hungarian throne and German troops invaded Hungary in August 1063. Henry gained his first military experience during this campaign. Béla died in an accident unexpectedly and the German army entered Székesfehérvár. Henry installed Solomon on the throne and attended his wedding to Judith before returning to Germany. Adalbert of Bremen accompanied Henry on the Hungarian campaign and struck up a friendship with him. Adalbert was mentioned as Henry's "protector" in royal diplomas from 1063, indicating a position equal to Anno's. Anno went to Italy to recognise Alexander II as pope at a synod in Mantua in May 1064, and in his absence Adalbert was able to strengthen his influence with Henry.

First years of majority

Henry was girded with a sword as a token of his coming of age in Worms on 29 March 1065. According to the contemporaneous account of Lampert of Hersfeld, Henry attacked Archbishop Anno of Cologne soon after the ceremony and only his mother could calm him down. Lampert's report is not fully reliable, but it is known that Anno was ousted from Henry's court. At Worms, Henry accepted Pope Alexander II's invitation to Rome. Agnes of Poitou recovered her influence, but she left Germany for Italy two months later and Archbishop Adalbert of Bremen took full control of state administration. Henry's journey to Rome was postponed first until autumn, and then indefinitely, although the Pope needed Henry's presence to overcome the Italian supporters of Antipope Honorius II. Instead of travelling to Rome, Henry visited Burgundy in June 1065. Burgundian diplomas show the local aristocrats regarded his visit as the starting date of his reign. From Burgundy, Henry went to Lorraine where he granted Lower Lorraine to Godfrey the Bearded in October.

Adalbert of Bremen, in concert with the King's young friend, Werner, abused royal prerogative to seize church property and took bribes for royal appointments. They persuaded the King to grant monasteries to the most powerful prelates and princes to appease their envy at their aggrandizement. Adalbert's attempts to take possession of Lorsch Abbey by force caused his fall, because the scandal enabled Archbishops Siegfried of Mainz and Anno of Cologne to stage a plot. They secured the support of Otto of Nordheim, Rudolf of Rheinfelden and Berthold of Zähringen and convinced Henry to dismiss Adalbert on 13 January 1066. Anno regained the King's favour, but thereafter no royal advisors could take full control of state administration.

Henry fell unexpectedly ill in the middle of May 1066. His sickness was so serious that he was thought to be dying. The aristocrats began to seek his successor, but he recovered in two weeks. He immediately married his betrothed, Bertha, most probably because the uncertainty about the childless monarch's succession caused widespread anxiety in his realms. Late in 1066, Prince Richard I of Capua rose up against Pope Alexander II and invaded Roman Campagna. Early in 1067, Agnes of Poitou hurried back from Rome to Germany to persuade her son to intervene on the Pope's behalf. Henry ordered his troops to assemble at Augsburg, but Godfrey the Bearded was faster and launched a successful counter-offensive against Richard in June. Godfrey's independent act was regarded as an insult to Henry's authority in Italy.

Adalbert of Bremen's fall had encouraged the Lutici (a pagan Slavic tribe dwelling over the river Elbe) to invade Germany and plunder Hamburg. In early 1069, Henry crossed the Elbe to punish the invaders. He defeated them, but could not prevent them from launching subsequent plundering raids against Saxony.

Saxon Rebellion and Investiture Controversy

Large parcels of the royal demesne were distributed during Henry's minority, and he decided to recover them around 1069. The bulk of the royal estates had been in Saxony. Henry sent Swabian ministeriales to the duchy to investigate property rights. The appointment of non-native unfree officials offended the Saxons, especially because the new officials ignored their traditional civil procedures. New castles were built in Saxony and Henry manned them with Swabian soldiers. Like his father, Henry spent more time in Saxony than in other parts of Germany and the accommodation of his retinue was the Saxons' irksome duty. The Thuringians were also outraged that Henry supported Archbishop Siegfried of Mainz's claim to collect tithes from them, although most Thuringians had been exempted from the church tax for centuries. The Margrave of Lower Lusatia, Dedi I, was the first Saxon lord to rebel. He claimed benefices that his wife's former husband, Otto I, Margrave of Meissen, had held, but Henry refused him in 1069. Dedi approached the Thuringians for help, but after Henry's promise to confirm their exemption from tithes the Thuringians joined the royal army. Henry invaded Dedi's domains and forced him to surrender.

Otto of Nordheim held vast estates in Saxony. After a nobleman, Egeno, accused him of plotting against Henry's life, Otto was summoned to "purge himself of that charge in single combat" early in August 1070. The contemporary historian Bruno the Saxon stated that Henry had paid Egeno to accuse Otto, but his account is biased. Fearing his case would not be judged fairly, Otto disobeyed the summons and fled from Bavaria to Saxony. He was soon outlawed and his benefices were confiscated. Henry invaded Otto's Saxon domains, but Otto raided the royal estates in Thuringia. Ordulf, Duke of Saxony, and most Saxon aristocrats remained loyal to Henry, but Ordulf's son and heir, Magnus, joined Otto's revolt. Henry ceded Bavaria to Otto's wealthy son-in-law, Welf, at Christmas 1070. Without their peers' support, Otto and Magnus had to surrender. Henry placed them in the German dukes' and bishops' custody on 12 June 1071.

Archbishop Adalbert of Bremen convinced Henry to release Otto of Nordheim in May 1072, but Magnus of Saxony remained imprisoned. Henry started appointing low-ranking men to royal offices in the whole kingdom and this practice outraged the German aristocrats. Rudolf of Rheinfelden and Berthold of Zähringen returned to their duchies from the royal court and rumours accusing them of plotting against the King spread in Germany. Rudolf appealed to Agnes of Poitou, asking her to reconcile him with her son. Agnes, who had moved to Rome in 1065, returned to Germany and mediated a reconciliation in July 1072. It proved temporary because Henry did not dismiss his advisors. Agnes shared the dukes' negative views of Henry's advisors and persuaded Pope Alexander to excommunicate at least five of them in February 1073, though Henry did not sever ties with them.

Appointments to the highest church offices remained crucial elements of Henry's authority: the practice enabled him to demand benefices for his supporters from the wealthy bishops and abbots, but the reformist clergy condemned it as simony. When Henry appointed a Milanese nobleman, Gotofredo, to the Archbishopric of Milan in 1070, Pope Alexander II excommunicated the new archbishop. Henry obtained Gotofredo's consecration, however, which brought him into a prolonged conflict with the Holy See. The Bishopric of Constance became another source of conflict in 1070 after the local clerics appealed to the Holy See to prevent the installation of Henry's candidate, Charles of Magdeburg, to the episcopal see. Henry denied Charles had bribed him, but he publicly admitted at a synod that his advisors may have received money from Charles. Pope Alexander II decided to investigate and summoned all German bishops who had been accused of simony or corruption to Rome, but he died in two months. The Romans proclaimed Hildebrand as his successor on 22 April 1073.

Hildebrand, who assumed the name Gregory VII, did not seek confirmation from Henry. He did not challenge Henry's prerogatives, but he was convinced a monarch who had regular contacts with excommunicated people could not intervene in church affairs. He regarded lay investiture as the principal barrier to completing the reform of the Church and challenged royal appointments, taking advantage of individual complaints against German prelates. Henry's Italian chancellor, Bishop Gregory of Vercelli, and an assembly of the German bishops, urged the King to declare Gregory's election invalid, because he had been proclaimed pope by the Romans instead of being elected by the cardinals. The German dukes and Godfrey the Bearded's influential widow, Beatrice of Tuscany, convinced Henry that he should cooperate with the Pope.

Bolesław II, Duke of Poland, invaded Bohemia in early 1073, and Henry decided to launch a punitive action against him. He ordered the Saxon aristocrats to assemble at Goslar, where on 29 June they asked Henry to redress their grievances. Henry made no concessions and withdrew from Goslar to Harzburg. Otto of Nordheim soon convinced the assembled Saxons to take up arms for their liberties. The Saxons marched to Harzburg, but Henry had fled to Eschwege. The Thuringians and the Saxons concluded an alliance and captured Lüneburg. To save the life of the commander of Lüneburg, Henry released Magnus of Saxony, whom the rebels acknowledged as their lawful duke without seeking royal confirmation. The German dukes and bishops did not come to Henry's rescue, and the rebels began attacking the royal castles. To prevent the rebellious Saxon bishops from securing the Pope's support, Henry addressed a letter of penance to the Pope, admitting he had been involved in simony. He claimed his youthful arrogance had been responsible for his sins and blamed his advisors for his acts.

Siegfried of Mainz, Anno of Cologne, Rudolf of Rheinfelden, Berthold of Zähringen and other German aristocrats came to Gerstungen to begin negotiations with the Saxon leaders in October 1073. They tried to persuade Henry to redress the Saxons' grievances, but he was determined to crush the revolt. A month later, Henry's servant Regenger informed Rudolf and Berthold that Henry was planning to murder them. Regenger was ready to prove his words in a judicial duel, but he died unexpectedly in January 1074. His statements, however, deepened the conflict between the King and the two dukes. Henry, who had just recovered from an illness, moved to Worms. The local bishop, Adalbert, denied his entry, but the townspeople rose up against the bishop and surrendered Worms to Henry. A grateful Henry exempted the burghers from customs duties, emphasising their loyalty in a time when "all the princes of the realm were raging" against him.

Liemar, Archbishop of Bremen, Udo, Archbishop of Trier, and eight bishops came to visit Henry in Worms in early 1074. Their retainers and the Worms militia joined Henry in a new military campaign against the Saxons and Thuringians, but he soon realised the rebels outnumbered his army and entered into negotiations with them. Henry accepted the rebels' principal demands in the Treaty of Gerstungen on 2 February. He agreed to destroy his castles and appoint only natives to offices in Saxony in return for the Saxon aristocrats' promise to raze their newly built fortresses. On hearing the agreement, the Saxon peasants captured and destroyed Harzburg and desecrated the graves of Henry's younger brother and first-born son. The destruction of the royal graves aroused public indignation, and Henry regarded it as a violation of the treaty.

Pope Gregory appointed the cardinal bishops Gerald of Ostia and Hubert of Palestrina to begin negotiations with Henry. Agnes of Poitou accompanied the two legates to her son's court. After Henry had done a public penance for simony, the legates absolved him on 27 April 1074. They summoned the German bishops to a synod to hear the case of Bishop Herman I of Bamberg who had been accused of simony, but eight prelates did not obey their summons. In response, the Pope suspended Archbishop Liemar from office, and summoned the disobedient bishops to Rome. Henry did not intervene in the conflict, although the German prelates under investigation were his staunch supporters.

Henry's brother-in-law, Solomon of Hungary, sent envoys to Henry seeking his assistance against his cousin Géza (who was Béla I's eldest son). Géza had defeated Solomon on 14 March 1074, forcing him to take refuge in the fortresses of Moson and Pressburg (now Mosonmagyaróvár in Hungary and Bratislava in Slovakia, respectively). Solomon promised to cede six castles to Henry and acknowledge his suzerainty in return for Henry's support to recover his country. Henry invaded Hungary and marched as far as Vác, but he could not force Géza to surrender. Pope Gregory sharply criticised Solomon for his willingness to accept Henry's suzerainty, because the Pope regarded Hungary as a fief of the Holy See.

On 7 December 1074, Pope Gregory asked Henry to compel the German prelates who had not obeyed his summons to attend a synod in Rome. The Pope suspended five German bishops for disobedience at the synod of Lent in Rome in February 1075. He blamed Henry's five advisors, likely those who had been excommunicated by his predecessor, for the conflict over the archbishopric of Milan. Henry and the German bishops wanted to avoid a conflict. Archbishops Siegfied of Mainz and Liemar of Bremen travelled to Rome to begin negotiations with the Pope. They did not protest when the Pope deposed Bishop Herman of Bamberg. The Pope appreciated their obedience and appointed Siegfried to hold a reforming synod in Germany.

Henry had meanwhile made preparations to take vengeance for the desecration of the royal graves at Harzburg. He promised amnesty and gifts to those who joined his campaign against Saxony. Most German dukes and many bishops hurried to Breitungen where the royal troops were assembling in June 1074. Saxon nobles and prelates also deserted to the royal camp. Under the command of Rudolf of Rheinfelden, the royal army launched a surprise attack on the Saxons at Homburg Castle on 9 June. Most Saxon noblemen were able to flee from the battlefield, but many of the common foot soldiers were slaughtered. Those who survived the massacre condemned the noblemen for their comrades' fate, and their stories turned the Saxon peasantry against their lords. Pope Gregory VII congratulated Henry on his victory, stating that the Saxons' defeat at Homburg was an act of "divine judgement".

Henry invaded Saxony again in autumn 1075. Godfrey the Hunchback, Duke of Lower Lorraine, was the sole German duke to join his campaign, but the Saxons were unable to resist. Otto of Nordheim convinced them to surrender unconditionally to the King on 26 or 27 October. Henry pardoned Otto and returned all his benefices except Bavaria. He showed no mercy to other rebel leaders, who were imprisoned and had their estates confiscated. Henry summoned the German dukes to Goslar to swear fealty to his two-year-old son, Conrad, as his successor, but only Duke Vratislaus II of Bohemia obeyed his command.

Road to Canossa

Henry knew that his dependence on Pope Gregory VII was loosened after his victory in the Saxon War. He sent Count Eberhard the Bearded as his deputy to Italy. Eberhard demanded an oath of fealty from the Pope's vassal, Robert Guiscard, Duke of Apulia and Calabria. Henry made one of his chaplains, Tedald, archbishop of Milan, thereby contradicting the Pope's former decisions. Alarmed by these acts, the Pope announced he would excommunicate Henry unless he changed his policies.

Henry regarded the Pope's words as a clear denial of the sacred nature of kingship. He held a synod in Worms on 24 January 1076. Two archbishops, twenty-four German bishops (two-thirds of the German episcopate), one Burgundian bishop, an Italian bishop and Godfrey the Hunchback attended it. At Henry's order, they declared the Pope's election invalid and demanded his abdication. An assembly of the Lombard bishops and aristocrats passed a similar resolution in Piacenza on 5 February. Henry's most important ally, Godfrey the Hunchback, was murdered on 22 February. Godfrey had named his nephew, Godfrey of Bouillon, as his heir, but Henry granted Lower Lorraine to his own son, Conrad.

Pope Gregory VII was informed of the decisions of the two assemblies during the synod of Lent in Rome. He excommunicated Henry and released his subjects from fealty in a public prayer addressed to Saint Peter. The deposition of a monarch by a pope was unprecedented, but the Pope was convinced Henry's extraordinary arrogance could not be punished otherwise. On learning of the Pope's decision Henry convoked a synod in Utrecht, but the local bishop, William I, was the only prelate willing to excommunicate the Pope. Henry wanted to demonstrate that the Pope's denial of the monarchs' role in the administration of the Christian community was responsible for their conflict. His chaplain, Gottschalk, completed a letter to be circulated in Germany, which emphasised that only God could judge a monarch. The letter addressed the Pope as the "false monk, Hildebrand" and ended with the dramatic warning demanding his abdication: "descend, descend!" Two incidents occurred in succession which discouraged Henry's supporters: a fire after a lightning strike destroyed the cathedral of Utrecht on 27 March, and Bishop William's sudden death on 27 April.

Henry's opponents regarded these incidents as divine retribution for his sinful acts. Bishop Herman of Metz released the Saxon rebels who had been in his custody. Bishop Burchard of Halberstadt, who had been one of the leaders of the Saxon revolt, escaped from captivity and returned to Saxony. Theoderic and William, members of the House of Wettin, also returned from exile and rose up against Henry. Henry invaded Saxony in August, but only Vratislaus II of Bohemia accompanied him. Their arrival provoked a general uprising, and Henry was forced to flee to Bohemia. The German aristocrats and prelates met at Trebur from 16 October to 1 November. They convinced Henry to accept the terms the Pope had set for him. He had to promise to dismiss his excommunicated advisors and acknowledge Gregory as the lawful pope. Furthermore, he was to acknowledge the Pope's jurisdiction in his conflicts with the German dukes and bishops. They announced they would elect a new king if Henry was unable to achieve his absolution before the anniversary of his excommunication. They also invited Pope Gregory to Germany to hold an assembly in Augsburg on 2 February 1077.

Henry moved to Speyer and lived there as a penitent. He decided to depart for Italy to achieve his absolution, because he wanted to prevent the Pope from hearing his case at an assembly dominated by his enemies. Although the winter was unexpectedly severe, Henry, his wife and their retainers crossed the Mont Cenis pass in December. On 25 January, they reached Canossa Castle where the Pope had sought refuge, fearing that Henry came to Italy to capture him. Henry remained barefoot and wearing sackcloth at the castle for three days. Matilda of Tuscany (who held the castle), Adelaide of Turin and Hugh of Cluny convinced the Pope he had no choice but to absolve the remorseful King. Before receiving absolution, Henry had to pledge to accept the Pope's judgement in his conflict with his subjects.

Civil war

Henry remained in Italy after his absolution, which surprised his German opponents. They held an assembly at Forchheim, arguing that it had not restored their oaths of fealty. The bishops, archbishops, dukes and the Saxons' representatives who attended the assembly elected Rudolf of Rheinfelden king on 14 March 1077. Although the papal legates who were present acknowledged Rudolf's election, Pope Gregory VII remained neutral. He maintained he was entitled to settle the dispute and informed both Henry and Rudolf he would hear their case at an assembly in Germany.

On hearing of the election of an anti-king, Henry replaced Rudolf's principal ally, Berthold of Zähringen, with Liutold of Eppenstein as duke of Carinthia and awarded Friuli to Sigehard, Patriarch of Aquilea. He confiscated Swabia from Rudolf and Bavaria from Welf, placing both duchies under his direct control. Before returning to Germany in April, Henry made his three-year-old son, Conrad, his lieutenant in Italy. He charged two excommunicated Italian prelates, Tedald of Milan and Denis of Piacenza, with Conrad's protection. Unable to prevent Henry's return, Rudolf of Rheinfelden moved to Saxony.

Henry visited Ulm, Worms, Nuremberg, Mainz, Strasbourg, Utrecht and Augsburg to demonstrate the full restoration of his royal authority. He rewarded his supporters with estates confiscated from his opponents, but the grantees had to obtain actual possession by force. Henry and Rudolf's armies approached each other for the first time near Würzburg in August, but Henry avoided battle as his forces were outnumbered. Both camps' aristocrats wanted to restore peace and agreed to hold a joint assembly in the absence of the kings at the Rhine in November. Henry sent troops to the Rhine to prevent the negotiations.

The papal legate, Cardinal Bernard, excommunicated Henry on 12 November 1077. Henry sent Bishops Benno II of Osnabrück and Theoderic of Verdun to Rome to begin negotiations with the Pope, whose position in Italy had been weakening. The Pope appointed a new legate, whose name was not recorded, to represent him in Germany. The papal legate celebrated Easter with Henry in Cologne on 8 April 1078, demonstrating that the Pope had not regarded Henry's excommunication as valid. Henry invaded Lotharingia and forced Bishop Herman of Metz into exile, but Berthold of Zähringen and Welf of Bavaria inflicted defeats on his Swabian and Franconian supporters. Rudolf of Rheinfelden hurried to Franconia and met Henry and his army of 12,000 Franconian peasants at Mellrichstadt on 7 August. The Battle of Mellrichstadt proved indecisive.

Pope Gregory prohibited all clerics from receiving royal appointments to bishoprics or abbeys in November 1078. The royal investiture was a basic element of royal administration. The ring and crosier the prelates received from monarchs during their installation symbolised their mutual dependence. At the February 1079 synod of Lent, Henry's opponents, Bishops Altmann of Passau and Herman of Metz, convinced the Pope to send new legates to Germany, but the Pope forbade his legates to pass judgement against the prelates who had been appointed by Henry.

Henry confiscated Rudolf of Rheinfelden's inherited Swabian estates and ceded them to Bishop Burchard of Lausanne in March. In the same month, he made a wealthy local aristocrat, Frederick of Büren, duke of Swabia. Frederick could only take possession of the lands north of the Danube, because Rudolf of Rheinfelden's son, Berthold, asserted his authority over the southern parts of Swabia.

Henry met with the papal legates, Bishops Peter of Albano and Udalric of Padua, in Regensburg on 12 May 1079. They convinced him to send envoys to Fritzlar to begin negotiations with Rudolf of Rheinfelden with their mediation. At the Fritzlar conference, the parties agreed to hold a new meeting at Würzburg, but Rudolf failed to appoint his representatives, thinking Henry had bribed the papal legates. Henry invaded Saxony in August, but Rudolf persuaded the aristocrats in Henry's army to obtain his consent to a truce. Henry sent agents to Saxony, and they convinced many Saxon leaders to desert the anti-king. He mustered troops from the German duchies, Burgundy and Bohemia and invaded Saxony in January 1080. He could not surprise Rudolf who defeated Henry's army at Flarchheim on 27 January. Rudolf did not take advantage of his victory, however, because the Saxons who had deserted him did not return to his camp.

Henry sent envoys to the synod of Lent in Rome and demanded the Pope excommunicate Rudolf, hinting he was ready to appoint an antipope to achieve his goal. Instead Pope Gregory excommunicated and deposed Henry and acknowledged Rudolf as the lawful king. A treatise, known as The Defence of King Henry, was published in Henry's defence which emphasised his hereditary claim to his realms. The treatise, likely written by the jurist Petrus Crassus, uses arguments based on Roman Law, showing the  had already been studied in Italy. Before returning to Germany, Henry's envoys, Archbishop Liemar of Bremen and Bishop Rupert of Bamberg, raised a rebellion against the Pope's principal Italian ally Matilda of Tuscany. They also secured the support of northern Italian aristocrats for Henry.

Henry's second excommunication was less harmful to his position than the previous ban. He held a council in Mainz on 31 May 1080. The nineteen German prelates and aristocrats who attended the council deposed Pope Gregory, labelling him as "the accused disturber of divine and human laws". Henry held a second synod in Brixen. Nineteen Italian, seven German and a lone Burgundian prelate confirmed the Pope's deposition 25 June, accusing him of simony, heresy and other sins. The synod elected Archbishop Wibert of Ravenna pope. Wibert assumed the name Clement III in reference to Pope Clement II who had been the first reformist pope to be elected through the intervention of Henry's father. Henry returned to Germany and assembled his troops for a new invasion of Saxony. Henry and Rudolf's armies met at Hohenmölsen on 14 October 1080. Henry's forces were defeated but it was a Pyrrhic victory for Rudolf, who lost his right hand and died. Henry took full advantage of the circumstances of Rudolf's death, describing it as a punishment for oath breaking. He began negotiations with the Saxons, offering to appoint his son, Conrad, king of Saxony, but Otto of Nordheim persuaded his fellows to refuse the offer.

Imperial coronation

Henry led a small army to Italy in March 1081. His Italian supporters had defeated Matilda of Tuscany's troops in the previous year at the battle of Volta Mantovana, enabling him to reach Rome without resistance. The Romans, however, remained loyal to Pope Gregory VII and Henry had to withdraw to northern Italy in late June. He began negotiations with the envoys of the Byzantine Emperor Alexios I Komnenos about an alliance against Robert Guiscard. He granted privileges to Lucca and Pisa, releasing them from Matilda's lordship. While Henry was in Italy, the Saxons invaded Franconia. Henry's southern German opponents elected Welf's kinsman, Hermann of Salm, king at a poorly attended assembly early in August. The Saxons only paid homage to Hermann four months later.

Henry left Italy for Germany in the autumn of 1081 but returned in February 1082. He laid siege to Rome but could not break the Romans' resistance. He charged Antipope Clement with the siege of Rome and began devastating Matilda's domains. Rumours of Hermann of Salm's plans to invade Italy forced Henry to remain in northern Italy, but Hermann did not risk an Italian campaign. Henry returned to the siege of Rome at the end of 1082. Emperor Alexios sent 144,000 gold pieces to him as a token of their friendship and promised a further 216,000 gold pieces in return for his support against Robert Guiscard. The treasure enabled Henry to bribe Roman aristocrats, and his troops captured the Leonine City in Rome on 3 June 1083. Pope Gregory VII continued to resist in the Castel Sant'Angelo. Henry withdrew from Rome again in early July. He concluded a secret treaty with the Roman aristocrats who promised to induce Gregory to crown Henry emperor or to elect another pope.

Henry launched a military campaign against Robert Guiscard in February and March 1084. During his absence, the Antipope convinced more than ten cardinals to desert Pope Gregory VII. They were followed by other clerics and papal officials. Resistance against Henry collapsed, and he entered Rome on 21 March. Clement was installed as pope and he crowned Henry emperor in St Peter's Basilica on 1 April. Henry stayed in the Lateran Palace for six weeks. He left Rome before Robert Guiscard came to Gregory VII's rescue on 24 May. Robert's troops sacked Rome, outraging the Romans, and Gregory had to leave Rome for Salerno. Henry ordered his Italian supporters to conquer Matilda of Tuscany's lands before he returned to Germany. However, her army routed his allies at the Battle of Sorbara on 2 July.

Reign as emperor

Consolidation
Pope Gregory VII repeated Henry's excommunication in late 1084, but many of the Pope's former supporters came to pay homage to Henry as emperor at Cologne at Christmas. His supporters and opponents held a joint conference on the river Werra on 20 January 1085 but could not reach a compromise. The Saxon Count Theoderic II of Katlenburg and Bishop Udo of Hildesheim entered into secret negotiations with Henry during the conference, but the Saxons who remained hostile to Henry soon murdered Theoderic and forced the bishop to flee from Saxony. After the bishop persuaded Henry to pledge he would respect the Saxons' liberties, many rebels laid down their arms.

The papal legate, Cardinal Odo of Ostia, summoned the German prelates who were loyal to Pope Gregory VII to a synod at Quedlinburg. The synod issued a decree that papal judgements could not be questioned and forbade the faithful to make contact with those who had been excommunicated. In response, Henry held a general assembly in Mainz in late April or early May. Three or four archbishops and fifteen bishops obeyed his summons. They deposed their peers—two archbishops and thirteen bishops—who had failed to come to Mainz. The synod also established the "Peace of God" in Germany, prohibiting armed conflicts during the main Christian festivals. Vratislaus II of Bohemia, who had always been Henry's loyal supporter, was rewarded with the title of king during this meeting.

Pope Gregory VII died in Salerno on 25 May 1085. Henry exploited his most prominent opponent's death to consolidate his position. Henry visited Lower Lorraine to end a conflict between his two supporters, Bishops Theoderic of Verdun and Henry of Liège in June 1085. He granted the County of Verdun to Henry of Liège's kinsman, Godfrey of Bouillon, and compensated Bishop Theoderic with estates confiscated from Matilda of Tuscany. Peace was not restored, however, because Godfrey of Bouillon soon laid claim to Matilda's estates. Henry invaded Saxony, reaching as far as Magdeburg in July. Hermann of Salm, Hartwig, Archbishop of Magdeburg and the archbishop's three suffragans fled to Denmark and the Saxons paid homage to Henry. Henry did not restore the rebels' confiscated estates and appointed new officials. The Saxons rose up in a new rebellion and forced Henry to withdraw to Franconia. Henry mustered a new army and invaded Saxony in January 1086, but the Saxons avoided a pitched battle. Henry withdrew to Regensburg. Welf of Bavaria laid siege to the town at Easter, but Henry was relieved by his supporters.

Henry's Bavarian, Swabian and Saxon opponents laid siege to Würzburg in July 1086, because possession of the town could secure their uninterrupted communication. Henry decided to force them to abandon the siege, but the rebels routed his army in the Battle of Pleichfeld on 11 August. Henry launched a military campaign against his enemies in Bavaria. In an attempt to restore peace, Bavarian and Swabian aristocrats from both kings' camps held a joint conference in Oppenheim in February 1087. Henry did not attend. He went to Aachen where his son, Conrad, was crowned his co-ruler on 30 May. On this occasion Henry likely rewarded Godfrey of Bouillon with the Duchy of Lower Lorraine.

A new joint conference of the German prelates and aristocrats assembled at Speyer in August 1087. Henry's opponents were willing to pay homage to him provided he had been absolved by the Pope. Henry refused them, maintaining he had been unlawfully excommunicated. Pope Gregory VII's successor, Pope Victor III, held a synod in Benevento around the same time. The synod passed no resolution about Henry, suggesting the new Pope had adopted a conciliatory policy.

A sudden illness prevented Henry from invading Saxony in October. After his recovery he launched a military expedition against the Saxon rebels. One of the rebel leaders, Egbert II of Brunswick, began to negotiate his surrender. Henry offered him the Margravate of Meissen, but Egbert decided to continue the fight against Henry after two Saxon prelates, Hartwig of Magdeburg and Burchard of Halberstadt, promised to achieve his election as king of Germany. The two prelates could not keep their promise, and Egbert swore fealty to Henry in early 1088. Egbert's about-face and Burchard's unexpected death on 7 April 1088 accelerated the disintegration of the Saxon rebels' camp. Hartwig of Magdeburg and his suffragans hurried to pay homage to Henry, and were followed to Henry's court by prominent Saxon aristocrats. Henry appointed Hartwig to be his lieutenant in Saxony.

Abandoned by his principal allies, the ailing Hermann of Salm sought Henry's permission to leave Saxony for his native Lorraine. His request was granted and he died in his homeland on 28 September 1088. Egbert of Brunswick rose up in a new rebellion and defeated Henry's army near Gleichen on 25 December. Egbert's estates were confiscated in February 1089. Henry, who had been widowed, went to Cologne to celebrate a new marriage with Eupraxia of Kiev in the summer of 1089. In the autumn, Henry returned to Saxony to prevent Egbert from attacking Hildesheim, but he continued to resist.

Return to Italy

Henry began negotiations with his Bavarian and Swabian opponents. They were willing to surrender, but they demanded the deposition of Antipope Clement III. Henry was inclined to accept their offer, but his bishops dissuaded him, fearing they would also be dismissed after the Antipope's fall. To prevent further negotiations between the Emperor and his opponents, Pope Urban II mediated a marriage alliance between Welf I of Bavaria's 18-year-old son, Welf the Fat, and the 43-year-old Matilda of Tuscany in the autumn of 1089. Henry decided to launch a new invasion of Matilda's domains. The Jews of Speyer approached him around this time for the confirmation of their rights that had been granted by Bishop Rüdiger Huzmann. He summarised their liberties in a diploma, protecting them against physical assaults and prohibiting their forced baptism. He issued a similar document for the Jews of Worms. Henry was often in need of cash and according to Robinson, both communities had probably paid a significant sum of money in return for his protection.

Henry invaded Matilda's domains in March 1090, forcing her to seek refuge in the mountains in April. The retainers of Henry's sister, Abbess Adelaide of Quedlinburg, killed Egbert of Brunswick on 3 July 1090. Henry made Egbert's brother-in-law, Henry of Nordheim, his principal representative in Saxony. Egbert's death put an end to Saxon opposition to the Emperor's rule, because he had secured Nordheim's loyalty with land grants. Henry continued his Italian campaign and captured Matilda's fortresses north of the river Po at the end of 1091. In June 1092, Henry crossed the Po and forced Matilda to begin negotiations for her surrender, but she and her vassals refused to acknowledge Clement III as the lawful pope. Henry laid siege to Canossa, but the garrison made a surprise attack on his army, forcing him to abandon the siege in October.

Henry's Swabian opponents elected the late Berthold of Rheinfelden's brother-in-law, Berthold II of Zähringen, to be their duke and he proclaimed himself the "vassal of St Peter" (that is of the Holy See). Henry had to send his German troops back to Germany to fight in Swabia and Bavaria. He began negotiations with King Ladislaus I of Hungary about an alliance, but Welf I prevented their meeting. Henry was forced to retreat to Pavia and Matilda's troops recaptured her fortresses.

Family feuds

Matilda of Tuscany and her husband managed to turn Henry's heir, Conrad, against him in the spring or summer of 1093. Henry had Conrad captured, but he escaped to Milan. According to Bernold of Constance, Henry tried to commit suicide after his son's rebellion, though Bernold probably invented this story to make a comparison between Henry and King Saul. Conrad's disloyalty aroused Henry's suspicion of his relatives, and he put his wife under strict supervision, allegedly for her infidelity. Four Lombard towns (Milan, Cremona, Lodi and Piacenza) made an alliance with Matilda of Tuscany. Henry fled to Verona whose margrave, Henry of Eppenstein, and Eppenstein's brother, Patriarch Udalric of Aquileia, were his last supporters in Italy. Henry's authority remained limited to north-eastern Italy, and Matilda and Welf I's troops prevented his return to Germany.

Empress Eupraxia decided to desert Henry and sought Matilda's assistance to rescue her from her house arrest early in 1094. Matilda sent a small force of soldiers to Verona who liberated the Empress and accompanied her to Tuscany. On meeting with Matilda, Eupraxia presented serious charges against her husband, accusing him of debauchery and group rape. She publicly repeated the charges in Pope Urban II's presence at the Council of Piacenza in March 1095. The Pope endorsed her words and confirmed Conrad's claim to the throne, recognizing him as the lawful king in April. Henry's enemies gladly spread Eupraxia's accusations, but modern scholars have regarded her statements as an effective propaganda tool against Henry, likely fabricated by Matilda's advisors. The Pope departed from Piacenza to France in triumph, but the teenage Welf the Fat left his middle-aged wife around the same time. The separation of Matilda and her husband came as a severe blow to the Pope, because the young Welf's father, Welf I, soon sought a reconciliation with Henry. Henry also conducted negotiations with Doge Vitale Faliero in Venice in June 1095. They renewed a commercial treaty and Faliero agreed to continue to pay a yearly tribute to the Emperor.

Pope Urban II proclaimed the First Crusade at the Council of Clermont in November 1095. The council also prohibited the bishops and abbots from swearing fealty to secular rulers. The first crusader bands, composed mainly of commoners and impoverished knights, departed for the Holy Land early in 1096. They attacked the towns along the Rhine and massacred thousands of Jews. After the first pogroms, the Jews sent a letter to Henry, seeking his protection. Henry ordered the German bishops, dukes and counts to protect the Jewish communities, but they could rarely prevent the fanatical mob from persecuting them.

Restoration

Welf of Bavaria's father, Adalbert Azzo II of Este, mediated a reconciliation between his son and the Emperor in early 1096. Henry restored Bavaria to Welf who lifted the blockade of the Alpine passes, enabling Henry to return to Germany in May. Aristocrats who had rebelled against Henry came to pay homage to him at assemblies held in Regensburg, Nuremberg and Mainz. He allowed the Jews, who had been forcibly converted to Christianity, to return to Judaism. In early 1098, Berthold II of Zähringen was also reconciled with Henry who exempted his domains from the jurisdiction of the dukes of Swabia and rewarded him with the hereditary title of duke.

The German magnates and prelates deposed Henry's rebellious son, Conrad, and elected his 12-year-old brother, Henry V, as Henry's co-ruler in May 1098. Conrad was abandoned by his allies and died forgotten in Tuscany. While in Mainz, Henry ordered an investigation into the missing property of the Jews who had been murdered by the crusaders. Several witnesses stated that Archbishop Ruthard of Mainz and his kinsmen had stolen large portions of it. Fearing retribution, the Archbishop and his kinsmen fled to Thuringia and began plotting against Henry.

Bretislav II, who had succeeded King Vratislaus as Duke of Bohemia, met Henry in Regensburg at Eastertide 1099. He wanted to alter the traditional order of succession to the Bohemian throne in favour of his brother, Bořivoj II. Henry granted his request and invested Bořivoj with Bohemia on 19 April. Although the dukes of Bohemia had acknowledged the German monarchs' suzerainty, this was the first occasion on which a Bohemian duke was invested in the same manner as the rulers of the German duchies. The restoration of public order was one of Henry's principal goals during the next months. He held assemblies at Bamberg and Mainz and ordered the (mainly Franconian and Saxon) magnates who were present to pursue robbers and thieves.

Antipope Clement III died on 8 September 1100, and his cardinals elected Theoderic of Albano as his successor. Henry's Italian supporters acknowledged Theoderic as the lawful pope, but Henry did not make contact with him. Count Henry of Limburg captured properties of Prüm Abbey. The Emperor laid siege to Limburg, forcing the Count to surrender in May 1101. The Emperor soon forgave Henry of Limburg for his rebellion and made him duke of Lower Lorraine before the end of the year.

An assembly of the German leaders proposed that Henry make peace with Pope Urban II's successor, Paschal II, in late 1101; there is no proof Henry followed their advice. Pope Paschal II was determined to overcome Henry and ordered his legate, Bishop Gebhard of Constance, to keep the resistance against the Emperor alive in Germany. The papal synod confirmed Henry's excommunication in the Lateran Basilica on 3 April.

Robert II, Count of Flanders, allied with Bishop Manasses of Cambrai—a Frenchman supported by the Pope—against Walcher whom Henry had appointed to replace Manasses as bishop of Cambrai. Robert laid siege to Cambrai; Henry came to Walcher's rescue, forcing Robert to lift the siege in October 1102, but Robert resumed the war on Walcher soon after Henry left Cambrai. Henry held a general assembly in Mainz on 6 January 1103, and proclaimed the Reichsfriede (imperial peace), prohibiting feuds and other acts of violence, for the first time in the whole empire. He threatened those who broke the peace with mutilation, without allowing the wealthy to pay penance.

Henry also announced he was planning to launch a crusade to the Holy Land. He addressed a letter to Hugh of Cluny. In it he explained to his godfather he intended to "make good the ruin of the Church, which was caused by us, through the restoration of peace and justice". His correspondence with Hugh (who was Pope Paschal II's staunch supporter) suggests Henry was seeking reconciliation. The Pope regarded Henry as the "chief of the heretics". He granted Robert II of Flanders the "remission of sins" (the same spiritual privilege granted to crusaders) for his fight against the Emperor's supporters. Robert II, however, feared losing his imperial fiefs and swore fealty to Henry in Liège on 29 June 1103.

Fall

A Bavarian count, Sigehard of Burghausen, criticised Henry for his favouritism towards the Saxon and Franconian aristocrats in Regensburg in January 1104. He had come to Regensburg accompanied by a large retinue arousing Henry's suspicion he was staging a plot. After Sigehard dismissed his retainers, a band of ministeriales and burghers murdered him on 4 February. The ministeriales likely took revenge on Sigehard for his arbitration in a case relating to their peers. Sigehard's kinsmen and other aristocrats, however, blamed Henry for his death saying he had failed to defend him.

Archbishop Hartwig of Magdeburg died in autumn 1104. His brother, Burgrave Herman of Magdeburg, and their nephew, Hartwig, departed for Henry's court most probably to achieve the younger Hartwig's appointment to the archbishopric, but Count Theoderic III of Katlenburg captured and imprisoned them for simony. Henry launched a punitive campaign against Theoderic. The military expedition ended abruptly because Henry's eighteen-year-old son unexpectedly deserted him on 12 December. The younger Henry later said that his father's failure to receive an absolution from the Pope had prompted his rebellion. His nearly contemporaneous biography claims that he wanted to secure the aristocrats' support before his ailing father's death to avoid a succession crisis. The discontented Bavarian aristocrats hurried to the young King and Pope Paschal II absolved him from excommunication early in 1105. Henry sent envoys to his son, who refused to negotiate with an excommunicated man.

Most Swabian and eastern Franconian aristocrats joined the younger Henry's rebellion. He also secured the Saxons' support during a visit to Saxony in April 1105. He launched a military campaign against Mainz to restore Archbishop Ruthard to his see in late June 1105, but his father's supporters prevented him crossing the Rhine. Henry expelled his son's troops from Würzburg in August, but his authority was quickly waning. His son took advantage of Frederick of Büren's death to take control of Swabia. Leopold III, Margrave of Austria, and Bořivoj II, Duke of Bohemia, deserted the Emperor at Regensburg in late September, though Bořivoj soon repented his betrayal, and supported Henry's flight from Regensburg to Saxony. His brother-in-law, Count Wiprecht of Groitzsch, accompanied Henry as far as Mainz in late October. Already in despair, Henry sent a letter to his son, asking him "not to persist in his desire to depose him from the kingship"; the younger Henry wanted no compromise.

Henry moved from Mainz to Hammerstein and then to Cologne. He decided to return to Mainz, because he wanted to defend himself at the German princes' assembly his son had convoked. The younger Henry met with his father at Koblenz on 21 December. Henry dismissed his retinue, because his son promised a safe conduct to Mainz. Instead, he was captured and brought to the castle of Böckelheim, where he was forced to cede the royal insignia to his son. The burghers of Mainz remained loyal to Henry, so his son summoned the German princes instead to an assembly at Ingelheim. Henry was allowed to attend the meeting, but it was dominated by his enemies. Having no other choice, he abdicated in his son's favour on 31 December. Later, he said he resigned only because of his "fears of imminent murder or execution".

Last year

Henry was staying in Ingelheim after his abdication, but his supporters warned him his son had decided to imprison or execute him. In early February 1106, he fled to Cologne where he was received by the townspeople with great respect. He declined all ceremonies, demonstrating that he was doing penance for his sins. His loyal supporter, Othbert, Bishop of Liège, made peace with Henry of Limburg to secure the Duke's support. Henry joined them at Liège and mediated a reconciliation between Henry of Limburg and Albert III, Count of Namur. Robert II of Flanders also promised him assistance. Henry addressed a letter to Hugh of Cluny, offering to accept all his terms in return for an absolution. He also wrote letters to his son, the German princes and King Philip I of France. All of them show he was determined to regain his throne.

Henry V invaded Lorraine, but his father's supporters routed his army at Visé on 22 March 1106. Henry of Limburg and the burghers of Cologne and Liège jointly persuaded the elderly Henry to "resume the office of emperor". Henry V laid siege to Cologne early in July but had to withdraw from the well-fortified town three or four weeks later. The deposed Emperor sent letters to the German princes accusing his son of treachery and hypocrisy. He fell unexpectedly ill and died in Liège on 7 August. On his deathbed, he asked his son to pardon his supporters and to have him buried next to his ancestors in Speyer Cathedral.

Bishop Othbert buried Henry in Liège Cathedral, but the excommunicated Emperor's body could not rest in a consecrated place. Eight days later, his corpse was unearthed and buried in an unconsecrated chapel near Liège. On 24 August his son ordered a new exhumation because he wanted to execute Henry's last will. The townspeople of Liège tried to prevent the transfer of Henry's corpse, but it was carried in a sarcophagus to Speyer. The sarcophagus was placed in an unconsecrated chapel of the Speyer Cathedral on 3 September. Five years later, Pope Paschal II granted permission to the younger Henry to bury his father as he had requested. Henry IV was buried next to Henry III in the cathedral on 7 August 1111.

Legacy

Henry's conflicts with his subjects, both sons, his wives and with the popes gave rise to a rich polemical literature during his lifetime. Both his supporters and his opponents based their portraits of Henry on two early medieval works: The Twelve Abuses contained a discussion about legitimate kingship, while Isidore of Seville's  contrasted kingship with tyranny. Consequently, polemical literature tended to provide a list of the characteristics of either good or wicked rulers when portraying Henry. For instance, in the 1080s, the Song of the Saxon War praised him as a "king second to none in his piety" who defended the widows and the poor and gave laws to the lawless Saxons. The , an anonymous biography completed in the early 1110s, described him as a vigorous and warlike monarch who employed learned officials and enjoyed conversations about spiritual themes and the liberal arts. In contrast Lambert of Hersfeld stated Henry had inherited a peaceful realm, but he "rendered it filthy, despicable, bloodstained, a prey to internal conflicts". Lambert also emphasised that Henry destroyed and robbed churches and put freemen into servitude.

Rumours of Henry's immorality established his bad reputation for centuries. The Saxons were the first to accuse him of debauchery and demanded he dismiss the "swarm of concubines with whom he slept". Polemical writings spreading in Germany after 1085 accused Henry of incest and pederasty, also claiming that he had fathered illegitimate children. Isidore of Seville listed immoral sexual practices among the tyrants' characteristics. Consequently, as Robinson emphasises, allegations of Henry's alleged sexual misconduct "provided his opponents with a useful polemical weapon".

Henry was not a successful military commander, primarily because he did not avoid pitched battles, in contrast with most 11th-century military leaders. He could likely adopt this high-risk strategy because he often mustered his troops from among merchants and peasants who were regarded as expendable. He lost most of his major battles; his sole victory at Homburg was primarily attributed to Rudolf of Rheinfelden by their contemporaries. On the other hand, Henry's adaptability and openness to compromise and his preference for dilatory tactics enabled him to survive most crises of his reign.

Henry's penitential "Walk to Canossa" developed into a powerful metaphor. Catholic clerics were the first to adopt it, regarding it as the symbol of the triumph of the Holy See over an immoral monarch. For 19th-century Protestant German nationalists, the Gang nach Canossa ("Road to Canossa") symbolized the humiliation of Germany by a haughty pope. Otto von Bismarck proudly declared before the Reichstag that "Don't worry, we are not going to Canossa, neither physically nor spiritually!" during his campaign against political Catholicism on 14 May 1872. Historians have adopted more sophisticated approaches. They emphasize that penance and reconciliation were integral parts of medieval life, so an anointed king's excommunication was more disturbing for Henry's contemporaries than his act of penance at Canossa. Henry, as Schutz concludes, "cleverly maneuvered the pope into a position in which he had to absolve him", but Gregory VII reduced him "from Vicar of Christ to being a mere layman".

Henry's death did not put an end to the Investiture Controversy. A renowned French lawyer, Bishop Ivo of Chartres, and his pupil, Hugh of Fleury, had paved the road to a compromise already in Henry's lifetime. They actually adopted an old view, condemned by reformist clerics, making a distinction between the secular possessions and properties of bishoprics and abbeys (temporalities), and the ecclesiastical authority and sacramental powers of the bishops and abbots (spiritualities). In 1122, Henry V and Pope Calixtus II included a similar distinction in their Concordat of Worms, whereby the Emperor renounced the right to install the prelates in their ecclesiastical offices with ring and staff in return for the right to invest them with their secular possessions using the sceptre. However, the German monarchs' right to acquire a dead prelate's treasury, introduced by Henry, remained an important source of wealth, especially during the reigns of Frederick Barbarossa and Henry VI in the second half of the 12th century.

Family

Henry's first wife, Bertha of Savoy, was a year younger than he. Until 5 August 1068, Henry regularly mentioned her as "consort of our kingdom and our marriage-bed" in his diplomas. Her disappearance from the diplomas was the sign of a growing disaffection. Henry sought a divorce at a general assembly in June 1069 stating their marriage had not been consummated. The assembled German aristocrats referred his request to a synod, which passed the matter to the Holy See in early October. Pope Alexander II made it clear Henry would only be crowned emperor if he abandoned his plan. Henry obeyed and Bertha was again mentioned regularly in his diplomas from 26 October 1069. She died on 27 December 1087.

Bertha gave birth to five children, but two of them—Adelaide and Henry—died in infancy. Her surviving children were:
 Agnes, who was born in 1072 or 1073, married Frederick of Büren and then Leopold III of Austria;
 Conrad, who rose up against Henry, was born in 1074;
 Henry, who dethroned his father, was born in 1086.

The —the earliest Icelandic chronicle of the Norwegian kings—refers to a daughter of an emperor (who must have been identical with Henry for chronological reasons), called Mathilde. According to this source, Magnus III of Norway exchanged messages with her and also composed a stanza for her. Other primary sources do not list Mathilde among Henry's children.

Henry's second wife, Eupraxia (known as Adelaide in Germany), was born around 1068. She was the daughter of Vsevolod I, Grand Prince of Kiev, but it was not her connection to Kievan Rus', but her first marriage to Henry of Stade, Margrave of the Nordmark, that made her an ideal spouse for Henry after her husband died in 1087. Henry of Stade had been a wealthy Saxon aristocrat and his widow's marriage to Henry contributed to his reconciliation with the Saxons. Henry and Eupraxia were engaged in 1088. In contrast with Bertha, Eupraxia was mentioned in only one of her husband's diplomas, showing that she never gained Henry's confidence. After the scandalous end of their marriage, she returned to Kiev where she died on 10 July 1109.

*Gunhilda's daughter by Emperor Henry III, Beatrix, is not displayed. She was Abbess of Quedlinburg and Gandersheim until her death in 1061.

See also
 Family tree of German monarchs
 Henry IV (Pirandello)

References

Sources

Further reading

External links 
 
 
 Report on the bust reconstruction (with images)
 Documents by Henry IV for the Bishopric of Bamberg, 17 August 1057, 
 Charter given by Henry to the bishopric of Bamberg, 17.8.1057. Photography taken from the collections of the Lichtbildarchiv älterer Originalurkunden at Marburg University showing the emperor's seal.

1050 births
1106 deaths
People from Goslar
 
Salian dynasty
11th-century Holy Roman Emperors
12th-century Holy Roman Emperors
11th-century dukes of Bavaria
Investiture Controversy
Medieval child monarchs
Monarchs who abdicated
Sons of emperors
People temporarily excommunicated by the Catholic Church
Burials at Speyer Cathedral